Anthony Robert Temple (born October 8, 1926) is a Canadian lawyer and former politician.

Temple was born in Belleville, Ontario. He was a lawyer by profession and an alderman in Belleville in the 1950s. Temple was the Liberal Party of Canada's candidate for the House of Commons of Canada in Hastings South throughout the 1960s. His first attempt to win a seat was in the 1962 federal election but he was elected in the 1963 federal election and served as a Member of Parliament for two years before being defeated in 1965. He attempted to regain his seat in the 1968 federal election but was unsuccessful.

Temple was also active in the Ontario Liberal Party and was a candidate in the 1954 Ontario Liberal leadership convention placing third of three candidates with 46 votes.

References

1926 births
Liberal Party of Canada MPs
Living people
Members of the House of Commons of Canada from Ontario
Politicians from Belleville, Ontario